Like Someone in Love is an album by American jazz pianist Horace Parlan featuring performances recorded in 1983 and released on the Danish-based SteepleChase label.

Reception
The Allmusic review awarded the album 4 stars.

Track listing
 "U.M.M.G. (Upper Manhattan Medical Group)" (Billy Strayhorn) - 5:04  
 "Ballade" (Isla Eckinger) - 5:50  
 "Scandia Skies" (Kenny Dorham) - 4:25  
 "Little Esther" (Horace Parlan) - 5:29  
 "Like Someone in Love" (Johnny Burke, Jimmy Van Heusen) - 8:42  
 "Duke Ellington's Sound of Love" (Charles Mingus) - 6:23  
 "Blues in the Closet" (Oscar Pettiford) - 5:53

Personnel
Horace Parlan - piano 
Jesper Lundgaard - bass
Dannie Richmond - drums

References

SteepleChase Records albums
Horace Parlan albums
1983 albums